Narsinh Mehta, also known as Narsinh Bhagat, was a 15th-century poet-saint of Gujarat, India, honored as the first poet, or Adi Kavi, of the Gujarati language. Narsinh Mehta is member of Nagar Brahman community. Narsinh became a devotee of Krishna, and dedicated his life to composing poetic works described as bhakti, or devotion towards Krishna. His bhajans have remained popular in Gujarat and Rajasthan for over 5 centuries. Most notably, his composition Vaishnav Jan To was Mahatma Gandhi's favorite and became popular with freedom fighters across India.

Biography 

Much of what is known about Narsinh Mehta is derived from his own compositions and poetic works, due to the lack of formal historical documentation during this period. Additional insights into Narsinh Mehta's biography are found in works from other poets of subsequent eras, as their poems describe in detail the personality of Narsinh Mehta and certain key events from his life.

Though there is no consensus among scholars on exact dates, it is believed Narsinh was born in 1414 and lived until the age of 79. While there is no specific date mentioned in Narsinh's autobiographical compositions or in works from later poets, the incidents depicted establish Narsinh's presence in the 15th century, notably during the reign of Mandallika III.

Early life 
Narsinh Mehta was born in the town of Talaja (now located in the Bhavnagar district, Gujarat). As a member of the Nagar Brahmin community, Narsinh's father held an administrative position in a royal court. Narsinh was mute until the age of eight. He began to speak only after meeting a holy man who had him utter the phrase "Radhe Shyam". His older brother, Bansidhar, was 17 years his senior. Narsinh's parents died when he was five years old, and he was left dependent on his older brother and his sister-in-law.

Based on the language, style, and emotion of Narsinh's poetic works, it is believed he studied in his Nagar family tradition and had knowledge of literary tradition and creativity. However, his poetry focuses exclusively on religious devotion and is attributed to becoming a devotee of Krishna.

Becoming a devotee of Krishna 
Narsinh and his wife Manekbai lived in his older brother Bansidhar's home, but were treated very poorly by Bansidhar's wife (Narsinh's sister-in-law or bhabhi). An ill-tempered woman, she taunted and insulted Narsinh repeatedly. One day, when Narsinh had enough of her taunts and insults, he left the house and went to a nearby forest in search of some peace, where he fasted and meditated by a secluded Shiva lingam  at Gopnath mahadev Mandir for seven days. Pleased by his devotion, Shiva manifested before Narsinh and took him to Vrindavan where he saw Krishna and the Gopis dancing (ras leela). There, he was given the service of holding the torch which lit the grounds for Krishna and the Gopis. He was so engrossed in watching Krishna that he didn't realize the torch was burning his hand. Krishna was pleased with Narsinh's devotion and granted him a wish. Narsinh asked to have never-ending devotion of Krishna and the ability to sing about his glory. Krishna granted him this, along with the constant vision of ras leela and the promise to always be at Narsinh's side. He resolved to compose around 22,000 kirtans or compositions.

After this transformative experience, Narsinh returned to his village, touched his sister-in-law's feet as reverence, and thanked her for insulting him for had she not made him upset, the above episode would not have occurred. Thereafter Narsinh moved out of his brother's home and to a small house in Junagadh, where he began a life of devotion dedicated to Krishna.

Time in Junagadh 
In Junagadh, Mehta lived in poverty with his wife and two children, a son named Shamaldas, and a daughter for whom he had special affection, Kunwarbai. His popularity grew as a bhajan singer, as he sang and danced the praises of Krishna in the company of all, regardless of gender, class, and caste. The Nagar Brahmin community, which Narsinh belonged to, found it offensive that Narsinh associated with those deemed a lower caste. The Nagar Brahmins were considered "high ranking", and known for their elegant manners, musical skills, and court appointments. Many Nagar Brahmin's at the time worshipped Shiva, and some sources state this contributed to their opposition and torment of Narsinh, who was an ardent Krishna devotee.

Narsinh's autobiographical works as well as later compositions from other poets provide a glimpse of certain key incidents from his life, depicting Narsinh's bhakti towards Krishna.

The wedding of Shamaldas 
The family priest of an influential individual named Madan Mehta, came to Junagadh in search of an appropriate partner for Madan Mehta's daughter. A local Nagar Brahmin suggested the priest meet Narsinh's son Shamaldas, hoping the priest would experience Narsinh's poverty and spread this news to other towns. However, the priest approved of Shamaldas and announced the engagement. Narsinh invited Krishna to the wedding, much to the ridicule of the other Brahmin's who mocked Narsinh's poverty and hopes that Krishna would help him. The wedding party of Shamaldas, full of people with meager means, departed Junagadh and arrived with much pomp and grandeur beyond everyone's expectations. It is believed that Krishna miraculously provided Narsinh's family with everything needed to celebrate the wedding of Shamaldas.

Putrah Vivah or Shamaldas no Vivah is a composition that depicts this incident and portrays Krishna coming to the aid of his devotee.

Promissory note 
Many in the community questioned the poverty of Narsinh and assumed he was deceiving everyone. The local Nagar Brahmin's once convinced a group of pilgrims to get a promissory note from Narsinh for ₹700, telling them that Narsinh was actually a rich man despite appearances. When approached by the pilgrims, Narsinh understood he was being tricked, but he accepted the money and wrote a promissory note to a merchant in Dwarka, where the pilgrims were traveling to.

The merchant named in the note was Shamalsha Sheth. Upon arriving in Dwarka, the pilgrims found no one had heard of an individual with this name, and assumed they had been scammed out of ₹700 by Narsinh. To their surprise, an individual named Shamalsha appeared looking for the pilgrims and paid the principal with substantial interest. It is believed the Krishna appeared as Shamalsha to fulfill the promissory note.

Narsinh's composition "Hundi", is famous not only in Gujarati but in other parts of India as well, and was written as a prayer to Krishna after he accepted this bond from the pilgrims ("Mari Hundi swikaro Maharaj re Shamala Giridhari...", which translates to "Oh God, please accept my note of credit..."

Ceremony for Kunwarbai's pregnancy 
One noteworthy autobiographical composition is based on Narsinh's daughter, Kunwarbai, and the ceremony that occurred in honor of her pregnancy. The tradition at the time dictated that the parents of the mother-to-be would give gifts to their daughter's in-laws during the seventh month of pregnancy, a custom known as mameru. Given Narsinh's extreme poverty and his total immersion in devotion to Krishna, he arrived to his daughter's in-laws home empty handed. When he asked them for a list of customary gifts to provide, Kunwarbai's in-law's provided a list of expensive items that would be unattainable for Narsinh. Upon receiving the list, Narsinh prayed to Krishna and soon a merchant, assumed to be the form of Krishna, appeared with gifts in abundance.

This episode has been captured in Narsinh's autobiographical composition - "Kunverbai nu Mameru" or "Mameru nu Pad".  The legend of Krishna coming to Narsinh's aid is also preserved through compositions by later poets and films.

Garland from Krishna 
The Nagar Brahmin's continued to oppose Narsinh, and instigated the King of Junagadh, Ra Mandallika to test Narsinh. The King falsely accused Narsinh, and demanded that Narsinh ask Krishna to send him the garland from the murti in the temple of Damodar. This alone would provide Narsinh's innocence and spare his life. Narsinh prayed all night and pleaded with Krishna to make the King's demand come true, so that others would not fear pursuing a path of devotion. The next morning, Krishna placed the garland on Narsinh's neck and Narsinh received an apology from the King.

Later life and legacy 
Some works by later authors, such as Narsinh Mehta nu Akhyan (written in the 18th century) attempt to establish the clan, ancestry and pedigree of Narsinh Mehta.

Many parallels are drawn between Narsinh's life events and those of other saint-poets such as Surdas, Tulsidas, Meera, Kabir, Namdev and Sundarar. Like many others of the era, Narsinh faced strong opposition from society but remained steadfast in his devotion. His acceptance and association with all people, regardless of caste, creed, and social status was unique to the Nagar Brahmins at the time and remained an important part of his adherence and commitment to the Vaishnav tradition.

In his later life, Narsinh went to Mangrol where, at the age of 79, he is believed to have died.

The crematorium at Mangrol is called 'Narsinh Nu Samshan''' , and commemorates the first poet known as Gujarati Adi Kavi

The Narsinh Mehta Award was established in his name to recognize excellence in Gujarati literature.

Vastrapur Lake in Ahmedabad has been officially renamed in his honor.

Poetic Works

Narsinh's poetic work is typically viewed as bhajans towards Krishna but also Hindu bhakti. As a pioneer poet of Gujarat, his bhajans have been sung in Gujarat and Rajasthan for over 5 years centuries The compositions are philosophical or ethical, and often descriptive of the love of Radha and Krishna

 Notable Features 
Narsinh's bhajans belong to the genre "deshi" in Gujarati, which is also known as "pad" as a close similar in North Indian languages. Both styles anchor in the traditional meters and popular tunes and rhythms. He is known for ragas common during the morning time, spring, and rainy season.

According to Champaklal Nayak, Narsinh is the first to compose bhajans about Krishna in the appropriate ragas. Narsinh composed items for his own singing, and it is impossible to confirm or reconstruct the melodies in which he sang them.

One of the most important features of Mehta's works is that they are not available in the language in which Narsinh had composed them. They have been largely preserved orally. The oldest available manuscript of his work is dated around 1612, and was found by the noted scholar Keshavram Kashiram Shastri from Gujarat Vidhya Sabha. Because of the immense popularity of his works, their language has undergone modifications over time.

Narsinh's work has expanded beyond his Hindu bhakti into secular contexts such as school events and cultural programs

 Genres of Gujarati folk Music 
Narsinh's bhajans are frequently performed in the popular gujarati genres of garbi, dhol, and prabhatiya. While garbi and dhol are celebratory genres, whereas the prabhatiya genere is sung in the morning to evoke peacefulness and contentment.

 Categories of Compositions 
Narsinh's works are typically organized into 4 broad categories that contain substantial overlap
 Autobiographical compositions: Putra Vivah/Shamaldas no Vivah, Mameru/Kunvarbai nu Mameru, Hundi, Har Mala, Jhari Na Pada, and compositions depicting acceptance of Harijans.
 Miscellaneous Narratives: Chaturis, Sudama Charit, Dana Leela, and episodes based on Srimad Bhagwatam
 Songs of Sringar. love poems depicting Radha and Krishna
 Songs of devotion, philosophical poems and didatic works

 Works used by Mahatma Gandhi 
See: Vaishnav jan to, his popular composition.

Mahatma Gandhi referenced Narsinh's work considerably in his speeches, writings, and public prayers. Gandhi's repeated reference to the bhajan Vaishnav Jana To shaped it as a global song of compassion, moral integrity, and duty to humankind. Gandhi elevated Narsinh's life and work beyond the religious context and into greater ethical and moral themes.

In popular culture
The first Gujarati talkie film, Narsinh Mehta (1932) directed by Nanubhai Vakil was based on Narsinh Mehta's life. The bilingual film Narsi Mehta in Hindi and Narsi Bhagat in Gujarati (1940) directed by Vijay Bhatt and had paralleled Mehta with Mahatma Gandhi. Narsi Bhagat, an Indian Hindi-language biographical film by Devendra Goel released in 1957. The soundtrack from the film, with music by Ravi Shankar Sharma and lyrics by Gopal Singh Nepali, became popular especially the song "Darshan Do Ghanshyam" (which was misattributed to the poet Surdas in the 2008 film Slumdog Millionaire). This was followed by Bhagat Narsinh Mehta, an Indian Gujarati-language film directed by Vijay B. Chauhan which released in 1984.Narsaiyo (1991) was a Gujarati television series telecast by the Ahmedabad centre of Doordarshan starring Darshan Jariwala in lead role. This 27-episode successful series was produced by Nandubhai Shah and directed by Mulraj Rajda.

Further reading

Works of Narsinh Mehta
 Narsinh Mehta.  Narsinh Mehtani Kavyakrutiyo (ed.). Shivlal Jesalpura. Ahmedabad: Sahitya Sanshodhan Prakashan, 1989
 Kothari, Jayant and Darshana Dholakia (ed.). Narsinh Padmala. Ahmedabad: Gurjar Granthratna Karyalaya, 1997
 Rawal, Anantrai (ed.). Narsinh Mehta na Pado. Ahmedabad: Adarsh Prakashan
 

Critical material in English
 
Munshi, K.M. Gujarata and Its Literature: A Survey from the Earliest Times. Bombay: Longman Green and Co. Ltd. 1935
Swami Mahadevananda (trans.) Devotional Songs of Narsi Mehta. Varanasi: Motilal Banarasidas, 1985.
Tripathi, Govardhanram. Poets of Gujarat and their Influence on Society and Morals.  Mumbai: Forbes Gujarati Sabha, 1958.
Tripathi, Y.J. Kevaladvaita in Gujarati Poetry like akhil bhramand. Vadodara: Oriental Institute, 1958.
Zhaveri, K.M. Milestones in Gujarati Literature. Bombay: N.M Tripathi and Co., 1938
Zhaveri, Mansukhlal. History of Gujarati Literature. New Delhi: Sahitya Akademi, 1978.

Critical material in Gujarati
Chaudhri, Raghuvir (ed.). Narsinh Mehta: Aswad Ane Swadhyay. Mumbai, M.P. Shah Women's College, 1983
Dave, Ishwarlal (ed.). Adi Kavi Ni Aarsh Wani: Narsinh Mehta ni Tatvadarshi Kavita. Rajkot: Dr. Ishwarlal Dave, 1973
Dave, Makarand. Narsinhnan Padoman Sidha-ras. A Lecture in Gujarati on Siddha-ras in poems of Narsinh Mehta.  Junagadh: Adyakavi Narsinh Mehta Sahityanidhi, 2000
Dave, R and A. Dave (eds.) Narsinh Mehta Adhyayn Granth. Junagadh: Bahuddin College Grahak Sahkari Bhandar Ltd., and Bahauddin College Sahitya Sabha, 1983
Joshi, Umashankar, Narsinh Mehta, Bhakti Aandolanna Pratinidhi Udgaata' in Umashankar Joshi et al. (eds.). Gujarati Sahitya No Ithihas. vol. II. Ahmedabad: Gujarati Sahitya Parishad, 1975
Munshi, K.M. Narsaiyyo Bhakta Harino.  Ahmedabad: Gurjar Granthratna Karyalaya, 1952
Shastri, K.K., Narsinh Mehta, Ek Adhyayan.  Ahmedabad: B.J. Vidyabhavan, 1971
Shastri, K.K., Narsinh Mehta. Rastriya Jeevan Charitramala.  New Delhi: National Book Trust, 1972

References

External links

Translation of Narsinh Mehta's poems into English by Sachin Ketkar
Biographical blogpost about Narsinh Mehta
 

1414 births
1481 deaths
People from Gujarat
Gujarati-language poets
Hindu poets
Bhakti movement
Gujarati-language writers
Brahmins who fought against discrimination
Cultural history of Gujarat
Indian Hindu saints
People from Bhavnagar district
Hinduism in Gujarat
15th-century poets